This is a list of the Boulton Paul Defiant operators.

Operators

Australia
Royal Australian Air Force
 No. 456 Squadron RAAF used the Defiant between its formation in June 1941 and November 1941 when it converted to Beaufighters. Squadron code letters 'PZ'.

British India
Royal Indian Air Force
 No.1 Air Gunners School (India)
 No.22 Anti Aircraft Co-Operation Unit

Canada
Royal Canadian Air Force
 No. 409 (Nighthawk) Squadron used the Defiant on night fighter operations between July 1941 and October 1941, using the squadron code letters 'KP'.
 No. 410 (Cougar) Squadron used the Defiant as a nightfighter between June 1941 and June 1942, using the squadron code letters 'RA'.

Poland
Polish Air Forces on exile in Great Britain
 No. 307 Polish Night Fighter Squadron "Lwowskich Puchaczy" used the Defiant between September 1940 and August 1941, using the squadron code letters 'EW'. 307 was a new nightfighter Defiant squadron formed but did not become operational until December defending western Britain. One of their aircraft was serial number N1671, EW-D, and is the sole complete surviving Defiant which is on display at the RAF Museum at Hendon.

United Kingdom
Royal Air Force

 No. 1422 Flight RAF
 No. 1479 (Anti-Aircraft Co-operation) Flight RAF
 No. 1480 (Anti-Aircraft Co-operation) Flight RAF
 No. 1481 Target Towing and Gunnery Flight RAF
 No. 1482 Target Towing and Gunnery Flight RAF
 No. 1483 (Bombing) Gunnery Flight RAF
 No. 1484 (Bombing) Gunnery Flight RAF
 No. 1485 (Bombing) Gunnery Flight RAF
 No. 1566 (Meteorological) Flight RAF
 No. 1600 (Anti-Aircraft Co-operation) Flight RAF
 No. 1602 (Anti-Aircraft Co-operation) Flight RAF
 No. 1616 (Anti-Aircraft Co-operation) Flight RAF
 No. 1622 (Anti-Aircraft Co-operation) Flight RAF
 No. 1623 (Anti-Aircraft Co-operation) Flight RAF
 No. 1624 (Anti-Aircraft Co-operation) Flight RAF
 No. 1631 (Anti-Aircraft Co-operation) Flight RAF
 No. 1692 (Radio Development) Flight RAF used the Defiant on Radar Counter Measures (RCM) operations
Fleet Air Arm
Operated the Defiant Target-Tug
721 Naval Air Squadron
726 Naval Air Squadron
727 Naval Air Squadron
728 Naval Air Squadron
770 Naval Air Squadron
771 Naval Air Squadron
772 Naval Air Squadron
774 Naval Air Squadron
775 Naval Air Squadron
776 Naval Air Squadron
777 Naval Air Squadron
779 Naval Air Squadron
788 Naval Air Squadron
789 Naval Air Squadron
791 Naval Air Squadron
792 Naval Air Squadron
794 Naval Air Squadron
797 Naval Air Squadron

United States
United States Army Air Forces
 No. 11 Combat Crew Replacement Centre USAAF - 1 aircraft

References

Notes

Bibliography

 Ansell, Mark. Boulton Paul Defiant. Sandomierz, Poland/Redbourn, Herts: Mushroom Model Publications, 2005. .
 Hall, Alan W. and Thomas, Andrew. Boulton Paul Defiant, (Warpaint Series No.42). Luton, Bedfordshire: Warpaint Books Ltd., 2003. .
 Halley, James J. The Squadrons of the Royal Air Force & Commonwealth, 1918–1988. Tonbridge, Kent: Air Britain (Historians) Ltd., 1988. .

External links
 Boulton-Paul Defiant TT.I & TT.III article at Bharat Rakshak website.

Lists of military units and formations by aircraft
Defiant